Pseudocyclopiidae is a family of copepods, comprising the following genera:
Frigocalanus Schulz, 1996
Paracyclopia Fosshagen, 1985
Pseudocyclopia T. Scott, 1892
Stygocyclopia Jaume & Boxshall, 1995
Thompsonopia Jaume, Fosshagen & Iliffe, 1999

References

Calanoida
Crustacean families